Tim Seifert (born 25 June 2002) is a German footballer who plays as a defender for Regionalliga Nordost club Berliner AK.

Career
After playing youth football for SSV Ulm, Bayern Munich and 1. FC Heidenheim, Seifert started his senior career at 1. FC Heidenheim, having been promoted to their first-team in summer 2021. He made his senior debut on 31 July 2021, coming on as an 85th-minute substitute in a 2–1 2. Bundesliga win over FC Ingolstadt.

In June 2022, Seifert moved to Berliner AK.

References

External links

2002 births
Living people
German footballers
Association football defenders
SSV Ulm 1846 players
FC Bayern Munich footballers
1. FC Heidenheim players
Berliner AK 07 players
2. Bundesliga players